The Department of the Environment and Heritage was an Australian government department that existed between October 1998 and December 2007.

Scope
Information about the department's functions and/or government funding allocation could be found in the Administrative Arrangements Orders, the annual Portfolio Budget Statements, in the department's annual reports and on the department's website.

At its creation, the department was responsible for:
Environment and conservation
Meteorology
Administration of the Australian Antarctic Territory and the Territory of Heard Island and McDonald Islands
Natural and built heritage
Greenhouse policy coordination

Structure
The department was an Australian Public Service department, staffed by officials who were responsible to the Minister for the Environment and Heritage. The department was headed by a secretary, initially Roger Beale (until early 2004) and then David Borthwick.

References

Australia
Environment and Heritage
Ministries established in 1998
1998 establishments in Australia
2007 disestablishments in Australia